The XIV Memorial of Hubert Jerzy Wagner was held at Tauron Arena Kraków in Kraków, Poland from 17 to 19 May 2016. Like the previous edition, 4 teams participated in the tournament.

Qualification
All teams except the host must have received an invitation from the organizers.

Squads

Venue

Results
All times are Central European Summer Time (UTC+02:00).

|}

|}

Final standing

Awards

Most Valuable Player
  Tsvetan Sokolov
Best Setter
  Georgi Seganov
Best Outside Spikers
  Michał Kubiak
  Uroš Kovačević

Best Middle Blockers
  Srećko Lisinac
  Teodor Todorov
Best Opposite Spiker
  Bartosz Kurek
Best Libero
  Vladislav Ivanov

References

External links
Official website

Memorial of Hubert Jerzy Wagner
Memorial of Hubert Jerzy Wagner
Memorial of Hubert Jerzy Wagner
Sports competitions in Kraków
May 2016 sports events in Europe
21st century in Kraków